The Serbian Orthodox Eparchy of New Gračanica and Midwestern America or Serbian Orthodox Diocese of New Gračanica and Midwestern America is a Serbian Orthodox Church diocese located in the midwestern region of the United States. Its headquarters are in Third Lake, Illinois. The diocese operates 69 churches and parishes in Alabama, Arkansas, Illinois, Indiana, Iowa, Kansas, Michigan, Minnesota, Missouri, Nebraska, South Dakota, Tennessee, Texas, and Wisconsin.

History

In 1998, the diocese opened the monastic women's Protection of the Virgin Mary Monastery in Ohio under then Bishop Job. In 2006, the monastery moved to Marshfield, Missouri. Later, the Protection of the Virgin Mary Monastery moved once again to Weatherby, Missouri in the same neighbourhood as St. Xenia Sisterhood and Holy Archangel Michael and All Angels Skete, all located at a common address: 28650 105th Street in Weatherby, Missouri. The three separate monasteries on the same general grounds are under the jurisdiction of the Serbian Orthodox Church in North and South America. Also, there is a fourth Serbian monastery (also women's convent) in Missouri in Greenfield -- St. Pachomious Monastery.

Bishops 
The bishop of the Serbian Orthodox Eparchy of New Gračanica and Midwestern America is Longin (Krčo).

See also

 Saints Constantine and Helen Serbian Orthodox Church
 Saint Sava Serbian Orthodox Church (Merrillville, Indiana)
 St. Sava Serbian Orthodox Cathedral (Milwaukee, Wisconsin)
 New Gračanica Monastery (Libertyville, Illinois)
 Saint Sava Serbian Orthodox Monastery and Seminary (Libertyville, Illinois)
 St. Pachomious Monastery(Greenfield, Missouri)
 Holy Archangel Michael and All Angels Skete (Weatherby, Missouri)
 St. Xenia Sisterhood (Weatherby, Missouri)
 Protection of Mother of God (Weatherby, Missouri)
 St. Xenia Metochion Monastery (Indianapolis, Indiana)
 The Nativity Of The Mother of God (New Carlisle, Indiana)
Serbian Orthodox Church in North and South America

References

Sources

External links
 Diocese of New Gracanica - Midwestern America

Religious sees of the Serbian Orthodox Church
Serbian Orthodox Church in the United States
Serbian-American history